Fulvio Cimino (born 6 August 1968) is a retired Swiss football midfielder.

References

1968 births
Living people
Swiss men's footballers
FC St. Gallen players
FC Wil players
FC Vaduz players
Swiss expatriate footballers
Swiss expatriate sportspeople in Liechtenstein
Expatriate footballers in Liechtenstein
Association football midfielders
Swiss Super League players